Kamaraj (also Romanized as Kamarej and Kamārej; also known as Kamarady, Kamārej-e Markazī, Kamārej, and Kamarej) is a village in Kamarej Rural District, Kamarej and Konartakhteh District, Kazerun County, Fars Province, Iran. At the 2006 census, its population was 1,389, in 292 families.

References 

Populated places in Kazerun County